Biblioteca Civica may refer to one of the following public libraries in Italy:
 Biblioteca Civica di Belluno, in Palazzo Crepadona, Belluno
 Biblioteca Civica Angelo Mai, Bergamo
 Biblioteca Civica Queriniana, Brescia
 Biblioteca Civica Brugherio, Palazzo Ghirlanda-Silva, Brugherio
 Biblioteca Civica Romolo Spezioli, Fermo
 Biblioteca Civica Berio, Genoa
 Biblioteca Civica di Padova, Padua
 Biblioteca Civica Gambalunga, Rimini
 Biblioteca Civica Girolamo Tartarotti, Rovereto
 Biblioteca Civica Centrale, Turin
 Biblioteca Civica Bertoliana, Vicenza